Sundby station is a rapid transit station on the Copenhagen Metro. It is served by the M1 line. The station is elevated from ground level and opened on 19 October 2002. It is located in fare zone 3. With an average of 1,000 passengers per weekday, it is the least-used station in the network.

References

External links
Sundby station on www.m.dk 
Sundby station on www.m.dk 

M1 (Copenhagen Metro) stations
Railway stations opened in 2002
2002 establishments in Denmark
Railway stations in Denmark opened in the 21st century